Gleidorf is a locality in the municipality Schmallenberg in the High Sauerland District in North Rhine-Westphalia, Germany.

The village has 1371 inhabitants and lies in the east of the municipality of Schmallenberg at a height of around 393 m. The river Lenne flows through the village. In the village centre the B 236 federal road meets the B 511.  Gleidorf borders on the villages of Schmallenberg, Bad Fredeburg, Grafschaft, Holthausen and Winkhausen.  

The first written document mentioning Gleidorf dates from 1072 in a charter from Grafschaft Abbey of bishop Anno of Cologne. The village used to belong to the municipality of Grafschaft in Amt Schmallenberg until the end of 1974.

Gallery

External links 
Gleidorf

References

Villages in North Rhine-Westphalia
Schmallenberg